Fort St. Vrain may refer to:

Fort Saint Vrain (also known as St. Vrain's Fort), a historic 19th century trading post in northern Colorado
Fort St. Vrain Generating Station, near Platteville, Colorado